Henri Alexis Tauzin (17 April 1879 in Paris – 11 October 1918 in Lyon) was a French athlete who competed in the early twentieth century. He specialized in the 400 metres hurdles and won a silver medal in Athletics at the 1900 Summer Olympics in Paris, his birthplace.

Tauzin also competed in the 200 metre hurdles, finishing fourth in his semifinal heat to not advance to the final.

References

External links

1879 births
1918 deaths
Athletes from Paris
French male hurdlers
Olympic athletes of France
Olympic silver medalists for France
Athletes (track and field) at the 1900 Summer Olympics
Medalists at the 1900 Summer Olympics
Olympic silver medalists in athletics (track and field)
19th-century French people
20th-century French people